2NU (pronounced "two new", and later 2NU2) is an American pop music group based in Seattle, Washington. Their music consists of spoken word performances accompanied by beats and sound effects. They are best known for their single "This Is Ponderous", which reached #46 on the Billboard Hot 100 in 1991. Original band members included Michael Nealy (lyrics), Jock Blaney (lyrics, lead and background vocals), Phil DeVault (keyboard, synclavier, guitar), Tom Martin (bass).  In 2009, their song "Crossroads" was featured in a television commercial for Johnnie Walker.

Name
When "This Is Ponderous" began getting radio play in 1990, the band had not formally come together. A DJ introducing the song said it was from a group "too new" to have a name, and "2NU" came from that.

Discography

Albums
Ponderous (1991)
2NU2.com (2000)
Raging Skies (2017)

EPs
This Is Ponderous (1991)
Command Z (1999)

Singles

References

External links
Homepage
Johnnie Walker commercial featuring "Crossroads"

American spoken word artists
Musical groups established in 1990
Atlantic Records artists
1990 establishments in Washington (state)
Musical groups from Seattle
Musical groups disestablished in 1991
Musical groups reestablished in 1997